The 2019–20 season is Defensores de Belgrano's 2nd consecutive season in the second division of Argentine football, Primera B Nacional.

The season generally covers the period from 1 July 2019 to 30 June 2020.

Review

Pre-season
Defensores de Belgrano announced their first signing of 2019–20 early in May 2019, as Sebastián Soto penned terms from Deportivo Riestra. Kevin Dubini's exit to Justo José de Urquiza was confirmed on 6 June, while the club unveiled a double signing from Brown on 7 June with Nicolás Benegas and Marcelo Lamas joining. Across the succeeding six days, El Dragón had an incoming and an outgoing in Elvio Gelmini (from Guillermo Brown) and Francisco Martínez (to Tristán Suárez). Pablo Miranda signed from Sportivo Desamparados on 15 June, which preceded the arrivals of Matías Quiroga and Leonel Müller on 19-20 June. Christian Moreno left the Núñez outfit on 22 June, agreeing a move to Acassuso. Juan Manuel Olivares, a third player from Brown, joined on 26 June.

A ninth new signing was completed on 28 June as Sebastián Giovini made the trip from Guillermo Brown. Defensores de Belgrano lost in back-to-back friendlies with top-flight Defensa y Justicia on 29 June, suffering 2–0 and 1–0 defeats. Numerous loans from the previous campaign officially expired on and around 30 June. Nahuel Peralta went away on 4 July, sealing a return to former team Deportivo Armenio. The acquisitions of Nicolás Álvarez and Guillermo Vernetti were fulfilled on 5 July. Defensores beat a team of free agents in Centro Integral del Futbolista Argentino in two matches on 17 July. On the same day, Tristán Suárez captured goalkeeper Cristian Correa from Defensores. Maximiliano Núñez came to Defensores from Atlético Bucaramanga on 19 July.

Martín García, a goalkeeper from Argentino of Primera C Metropolitana, sealed his arrival on 19 July. Defensores travelled to face the Vélez Sarsfield Reserves in Ituzaingó on 20 July, where a 2–1 victory would be followed by a goalless draw. Defensores shared wins with Acassuso in pre-season matches on 25 July, with Nicolás Benegas scoring twice in their victory. They did likewise on 2 August versus Ferro Carril Oeste, with fellow new signing Maximiliano Núñez netting for them on that occasion. 10 August saw Defensores head to Huracán for a friendly, losing by a single goal at the Campo de Deportes Jorge Newbery in Buenos Aires. Federico Marín arrived on loan from Huracán on 15 August. Their last friendly, versus Fénix, was postponed due to poor weather.

August
A visit to Gimnasia y Esgrima (M)'s Estadio Víctor Antonio Legrotaglie ended in a goalless draw on 18 August in Defensores' first Primera B Nacional encounter of the new campaign. Three days after, Defensores faced top division Lanús in a friendly and drew 1–1. Gonzalo Mottes, from Gimnasia y Esgrima (LP), and Leandro Rodríguez, from All Boys, were announced as new players on 21 August. Defensores lost 1–0 away to Quilmes on 26 August. Defensores tied 2–2 at home to Atlético de Rafaela on 31 August.

Squad

Transfers
Domestic transfer windows:3 July 2019 to 24 September 201920 January 2020 to 19 February 2020.

Transfers in

Transfers out

Loans in

Friendlies

Pre-season
Defensa y Justicia, of the Primera División, revealed pre-season friendlies with Defensores de Belgrano on 27 June. They also met Centro Integral del Futbolista Argentino, a team of free agents, and the Vélez Sarsfield Reserves. Defensores would face Acassuso on 25 July, Ferro Carril Oeste on 2 August, Huracán on 10 August and Fénix on 17 August.

Mid-season
A trip to Lanús was scheduled for 21 August.

Competitions

Primera B Nacional

Results summary

Matches
The fixtures for the 2019–20 league season were announced on 1 August 2019, with a new format of split zones being introduced. Defensores de Belgrano were drawn in Zone B.

Squad statistics

Appearances and goals

Statistics accurate as of 3 September 2019.

Goalscorers

Matías QuirogaEzequiel Aguirre

Notes

References

Defensores de Belgrano seasons
Defensores de Belgrano